Metra  is the commuter rail system in the Chicago metropolitan area serving the city of Chicago and its surrounding suburbs via the Union Pacific Railroad, BNSF Railway, and other railroads. The system operates 242 stations on 11 rail lines. It is the fourth busiest commuter rail system in the United States by ridership and the largest and busiest commuter rail system outside the New York City metropolitan area. The estimated busiest day for Metra ridership occurred on November 4, 2016—the day of the Chicago Cubs 2016 World Series victory rally.

Metra is the descendant of numerous commuter rail services dating to the 1850s. The present system dates to 1974, when the Illinois General Assembly established the Regional Transportation Authority (RTA) to consolidate all public transit operations in the Chicago area, including commuter rail. The RTA's creation was a result of the anticipated failure of commuter service operated and owned by various private railroad companies in the 1970s. In a 1983 reorganization, the RTA placed commuter rail under a newly formed Commuter Rail Division, which branded itself as Metra in 1985. Freight rail companies still operate four of Metra's routes under purchase-of-service agreements. Metra owns all rolling stock and is responsible for all stations along with the respective municipalities. Since its inception, Metra has directed more than $5 billion into the commuter rail system of the Chicago metropolitan area alongside the CTA. In January 2023, Metra rolled out a new real-time train tracking website to allow passengers greater visibility into their commute.

History

Early Chicago commuter rail 
Since its founding in the 19th century, Chicago has been a major Midwestern hub in the North American rail network. It has more trackage radiating in more directions than any other city in North America. Railroads set up their headquarters in the city and Chicago became a center for building freight cars, passenger cars and diesel locomotives. Early commuter services were run by the Chicago, Burlington and Quincy, Chicago and Northwestern, and Milwaukee Road.

By the 1930s, Chicago had the world's largest public transportation system, but commuter rail services started to decline. By the mid-1970s, the commuter lines faced an uncertain future. The Burlington Northern, Milwaukee Road, Chicago and North Western and Illinois Central had been losing money for several years, and were using trainsets with passenger cars dating as far back as the 1920s.

Formation of the RTA 

To provide stability to the commuter rail system, the Illinois General Assembly formed the Regional Transportation Authority in 1974. Its purpose was to fund and plan the Chicago region's public transportation. After initially using second-hand equipment, the RTA took delivery of the first new EMD F40PH locomotives in 1976. That F40PH fleet is still in service today. The companies that had long provided commuter rail in the Chicago area continued to operate their lines under contract to the RTA.

Less than a decade later the Regional Transportation Authority was already suffering from ongoing financial problems. Additionally, two rail providers, the Rock Island Line and the Milwaukee Road, went bankrupt, forcing the RTA to create the Northeast Illinois Regional Commuter Railroad Corporation to operate their lines directly in 1982. In 1983 the Illinois Legislature reorganized the agency. That reorganization left the Regional Transportation Authority in charge of day-to-day operations of all bus, heavy rail and commuter rail services throughout the Chicago metropolitan area. It was also responsible for directing fare and service levels, setting up budgets, finding sources for capital investment and planning. A new Commuter Rail Division was created to handle commuter rail operations; along with CTA and Pace, it was one of RTA's three "service boards".

Metra branding 

The board of the RTA Commuter Rail Division first met in 1984. In an effort to simplify the operation of commuter rail in the Chicago area, in July 1985 it adopted a unified brand for the entire system–Metra, or Metropolitan Rail. The newly reorganized Metra service helped to bring a single identity to the many infrastructure components serviced by the Regional Transportation Authority's commuter rail system. However, the system is still legally known as the Commuter Rail Division of the RTA.

Today, Metra's operating arm, the Northeast Illinois Regional Commuter Railroad Corporation, operates seven Metra owned routes. Four other routes continue to be operated by Union Pacific (formerly Chicago & North Western) and BNSF (formerly Burlington Northern) under contract to Metra. Service throughout the network is provided under the Metra name (in keeping with Metra's goal of providing a single identity for all commuter rail in the region). Metra also owns all rolling stock, controls fares and staffing levels, and is responsible for most of the stations. However, the freight carriers who operate routes under contract use their own employees and control the right-of-way for those routes.

Growth and expansion 
In the late 20th and early 21st centuries, Metra experienced record ridership and expanded its services. In 1996, Metra organized its first new line, the North Central Service, running from Union Station to Antioch. By 2006, it added new intermediate stops to that same route, extended the Union Pacific West Line from Geneva to Elburn and extended SouthWest Service from Orland Park to Manhattan. In 2012, it boasted 95.8% average on-time performance (measured only for a train's arrivals at its last station no more than six minutes late). It also posted its fourth highest volume in its history despite decreases in employment opportunities in downtown Chicago.

Metra continued to seek expansion options and to improve passenger service. Over the past three decades, Metra has invested more than $5 billion into its infrastructure. That investment has been used to purchase new rolling stock, build new stations, renovate tracks, modernize signal systems and upgrade support facilities. In addition to core improvements on the Union Pacific Northwest and Union Pacific West Lines, planning advanced on two new Metra routes, SouthEast Service and the Suburban Transit Access Route ("STAR" Line).

Corruption 

Metra also has been marred by allegations and investigations of corruption. In April 2002, board member Don Udstuen resigned from both Metra and his executive job with the Illinois State Medical Society, after admitting to taking bribes to steer Metra contracts to firms associated with former legislator Roger Stanley and pleading guilty to his part in Illinois's Operation Safe Road scandal.

In April 2010, Metra's executive director, Phil Pagano, faced investigation for taking an unauthorized $56,000 bonus and was later found to have improperly received $475,000 in vacation pay. The day that the agency's board was scheduled to discuss his fate, Pagano stepped in front of a moving Metra train in an apparent suicide. Around the time of Pagano's death, allegations also surfaced that a Metra employee demanded a $2,000 payoff from the studio that used Metra in the 2011 film Source Code. That employee was later relieved of his duties, and retired.

In June 2013, Metra CEO Alex Clifford abruptly resigned his position with no public comment. It gradually was reported that his exit had been demanded by the Metra board, which negotiated a $871,000 severance package including a non-disclosure agreement. Clifford's ouster was allegedly arranged because he rejected requests for patronage hiring and promotion, including a request to promote a longtime supporter of State Representative Michael Madigan. In the wake of this scandal, five board members resigned. In August 2013, the remaining board members unanimously elected Don Orseno as interim CEO. (The six-member board was operating with reduced membership and thus lacked the authority to elect a permanent CEO. Orseno and Alex Wiggins shared duties as co-executive directors.) Orseno's long railroad career, beginning with work to set up trains and check doors for the Chicago, Rock Island and Pacific Railroad played favorably in the board's decision. By October 2013, local officials had restored Metra's board to 11 members. After reviewing four candidates, the re-constituted board formally appointed Orseno CEO of Metra in January 2014.
In 2014, "a lengthy history of political patronage hiring at" Metra was reported, based on past files.

Underfunding 
For a long time, Metra was not being funded enough to keep most equipment and rolling stock up to date. On average, the agency received approximately $700 million a year, but Metra claims to need about $2 billion a year, which only since 2020 has been accomplished. Because of this, Metra had to cut back on new rolling stock, instead resorting to their Rebuild Programs, in which they rebuild railcars and locomotives with newer state of the art utilities. Rebuilds cost only a fraction as much as buying new rolling stock, such as with their Amerail built cars. Rebuild programs can rebuild aging cars for approximately $650,000, whereas buying that same railcar new would be approximately $3 million."

Operations

Stations 

Metra serves passengers through stations throughout the Chicago metropolitan area. Each station, unless a route or branch terminus, provides travel toward (inbound) and away from (outbound) downtown Chicago. Therefore, a passenger can connect between the city and a suburb or between two points in the suburbs using Metra service. Although Metra's commuter rail system is designed to connect points all over the Chicago metropolitan area, it does provide some intracity connections within Chicago.

Metra trains originate from one of four stations in downtown Chicago. Six lines originate at Union Station. The three Union Pacific lines originate at Ogilvie Transportation Center, formerly and still popularly called North Western Station. The Rock Island District originates at LaSalle Street Station. The Metra Electric District originates at Millennium Station, formerly and still often called Randolph Street Terminal. All four terminals are situated within walking distance of the Chicago Loop, so Metra passengers can easily transfer to a different Metra line upon their arrival downtown. Metra's urban-centric service remains popular with suburban commuters working downtown, reverse commuters, and those who visit Chicago for recreational activities and tourism.

Stations are found throughout Chicago, as well as in suburban Cook, DuPage, Kane, Lake, McHenry, and Will counties—an area largely coextensive with the inner ring of the Chicago metropolitan area. One station is located in Kenosha, Wisconsin.

Routes 

Metra operates on 11 lines, most of which date from the mid-19th century. Four lines are operated under purchase-of-service agreements. The BNSF Line service is operated by BNSF Railway. The three lines out of the Ogilvie Transportation Center (formerly North Western Station) are operated by the Union Pacific Railroad. The other seven lines are operated by the Northeast Illinois Regional Commuter Rail Corporation (NIRC), Metra's operating subsidiary. Inbound trains on every line at all times run through to their Chicago terminus, however, many outbound trains do not run through to their respective lines' terminus (for example, most trains on the Union Pacific Northwest Line do not run through to Harvard; instead, terminating at Crystal Lake).

█ 
The BNSF Line is Metra's busiest route. It had an average of 63,000 weekday passenger trips in 2018–2019.

█ 
It had an average of 2,600 weekday passenger trips in 2018–2019.

█ 
The line had an average of 28,100 passenger weekday trips in 2018–2019.

█ 
The line had an average of 22,100 weekday passenger trips in 2018–2019.

█ 
The line had an average of 20,600 weekday passenger trips in 2018–2019.

█ 
It had an average of 5,600-weekday passenger trips in 2018–2019. It does not run at all on weekends and holidays.

█ 
The Rock Island District is a  route (not inclusive of the  Beverly Branch) to the southwest and southern suburbs. It had an average of 26,900 weekday passenger trips in 2018–2019.

█ 
It had an average of 9,600-weekday passenger trips in 2018–2019. It does not run at all on Sundays and holidays, and Saturday service is currently suspended.

█ 
The line had an average of 34,600 weekday passenger trips in 2018–2019.

█ 
The line had an average of 40,100 weekday passenger trips in 2018–2019.

█ 
The line had an average of 27,900 weekday passenger trips in 2018–2019.

Proposed routes 
Metra proposed two routes in the early 2000s, SouthEast Service, which would connect some portions of the southern suburbs with downtown Chicago, and the Suburban Transit Access Route, which would connect various suburbs with each other without going into downtown. , only the SouthEast Service is still being considered.

Pre-Metra routes 
Several commuter lines were discontinued before Metra was established. The Illinois Central West Line from present-day Millennium Station to Addison, Illinois, (closed 1931), Pennsylvania Railroad line to Valparaiso, Indiana, (closed 1935), New York Central line from LaSalle Street Station to Elkhart, Indiana, (closed 1964), and four Chicago & North Western lines to St. Charles, Aurora, Freeport, and Kenosha-Harvard (all municipalities in Illinois and Wisconsin, closed 1930–51). The Burlington Route had service between Aurora and West Chicago, Illinois (closed 1943). Chicago Eastern Illinois operated commuter service on this line out of Dearborn Station to Dolton and Momence, respectively. The Chicago and Eastern Illinois commuter line to Momence, Illinois, ended in 1935, while the Chicago and Western Indiana service to Dolton, Illinois, was discontinued in 1964. Chicago Great Western had commuter service to DeKalb, Illinois (closed 1906). Santa Fe service to Joliet, Illinois (closed 1903). However, Metra runs service to Joliet, Illinois, on two routes: Heritage Corridor and Rock Island District.

Ridership 
Ridership has been slowly declining on all but one line since 2014, as seen below. The figures post-2020 have been drastically affected by the ongoing COVID-19 pandemic. Though monthly reports from 2022 show heavy improvement over 2021 figures, they are still dramatically below pre-pandemic levels.

Annual ridership

Weekday ridership

Weekend ridership

Connections 
Transportation in Chicago consists of a public transportation infrastructure allowing for intermodal connections to local, regional, national and international transportation services. Parking lots are available adjacent to most suburban Metra stations for passengers connecting with their train by car. Most parking lots are operated by the municipality they are located in. Fees and fines are also assessed by the local municipality; however, parking is usually free on weekends and most holidays. Mass transit CTA and suburban Pace buses connect with many Metra stations downtown and in the suburbs. Monthly pass holders are offered link-up options with these services. In addition, many intercity bus lines connect with passengers outside of Union Station.

The Chicago "L" also has transfers with Metra at some Chicago stations. Most 'L' lines traverse the Loop allowing nearby access to all downtown Metra terminals. There are also transfer points between Metra and the 'L' outside of the Loop, such as transfers from the Union Pacific Northwest Line to the Blue Line at Irving Park and Jefferson Park Transit Center; and from the Union Pacific West Line to the Green Line at Oak Park. 'L' trains announce downtown Metra connections onboard when announcing the next 'L' stop.

Union Station doubles as both a Metra station and Amtrak's station in Chicago. In addition to Illinois Service and Hiawatha Service, Amtrak trains run nationwide including service to states spanning both coastlines. Passengers connecting from Ogilvie Transportation Center can access Union Station through its north platforms on the opposite side of Madison Street, with Millennium and LaSalle stations also within a short walking distance of Union Station as well. A number of suburban Metra stations are also shared with Amtrak as well.

The South Shore Line, an interurban line connecting Chicago with the Indiana suburbs and South Bend, originates at Millennium Station and operates along much of the Chicago portion of the Electric District line, as far south as 63rd Street. Per a longstanding noncompete agreement, eastbound South Shore trains only stop at shared Electric District stations to board passengers, and westbound South Shore trains only stop to discharge passengers.

Positive train control 
In regards to the PTC mandate that passed Congress, Metra took steps to meet the deadline. Metra concluded that the December 31, 2015 mandate to have PTC running was an unreasonable requirement. This aligned with the stance taken by much of the railroad industry. This is due to a variety of factors including but not limited to: delays from the government, and the fundamental complexity of building a program from the ground up. Moreover, Metra estimates the cost of implementing the system on their  of track in the Chicago region to be over $200 million. The fear is this unfunded mandate will divert scarce capital funds from other essential needs. This includes building and maintaining existing tracks, stations, signals, and other equipment that ensures a safe operating environment for all of Metra's passengers. However, Metra recognizes the need for PTC but needed a more reasonable timeline to implement such a program. This recognition is partially based on Metra's previous accident history. Two noteworthy events were a pair of accidents on the Rock Island District within a span of a couple of years. The first event was a derailment that occurred on October 12, 2003, when a train flew through a 10 mph crossing at 68 mph. A second very similar occurrence happened on September 17, 2005, but was more serious. The latter derailment killed two passengers and injured 117. Both of these incidents could have been prevented if PTC were in place. In both circumstances, PTC would have overridden the engineer and slowed the train down to the appropriate speed to prevent an accident from occurring.

Recently, Metra has taken significant steps in the process to fully implementing PTC. On April 22, 2015, the Metra board approved an $80 million contract to Parsons Transportation Group. Parsons was the sole bidder and speaks to the complexities of the project. They will be in charge of incorporating various devices from GPS, radio, to trackside antennas into one cohesive system. The group has some experience in this sector previously as Parsons worked with the southern California commuter rail agency Metrolink to install their system.

By the year 2020, Metra completed installation of the Positive Train Control. This came at a capital cost of $400 million and an annual operating cost of $20 million. Metra's PTC system works with the trains of 12 other railroad companies.

Fare system and ticketing 

Fare is determined by the distance traveled by a passenger. Each station along every route has been placed in a specific zone based on its distance from its respective downtown station. The downtown terminal and downtown stations are classified as zone 'A' and each additional zone generally represents an added  from the downtown terminus. Multiple stations can be placed in the same zone even though they are on the same line. Fare zones include A, B, C, D, E, F, G, H, I, and J.

Tickets 
Several ticketing options exist for passengers. Riders may choose to purchase one-way tickets, 10-ride tickets, weekend passes, day passes, or monthly passes.

 A one-way ticket is used for one-way travel between two stations. For round trip travel, two one-way tickets can be purchased. One-way tickets can be purchased from ticket agents, from the Ventra app, or on the train from a conductor. Conductors will charge an extra $5 if a ticket agent was available at the passenger's departing station.
 A 10-ride ticket provides ten rides between two zones determined at the time of purchase. Ten-ride tickets can be shared between passengers and expire 90 days after the date of purchase. Ten-ride tickets can be purchased from ticket agents, or from the Ventra app.
 A Saturday or Sunday day pass provides unlimited travel between any and all zones for one passenger on a Saturday, Sunday, or certain holidays. Weekend passes can always be purchased from conductors without a surcharge. Weekend passes can also be purchased from ticket agents, or from the Ventra app. As of 2022, Saturday or Sunday weekend passes cost $7.
 A weekend pass (Ventra app only) provides unlimited travel between any and all zones for one passenger on a Saturday and Sunday. In the past, weekend passes were extended to include holidays adjacent to the weekend, but this practice seems to have ended. Weekend passes are only available within the Ventra app. As of 2022, weekend passes cost $10.
 A day pass (Ventra app only), similar to a Saturday or Sunday day pass, provides unlimited travel for one day on any day of the week. The $6 day pass is valid for unlimited travel within one to three zones. The $10 day pass is valid for unlimited travel between all zones. Passengers are required to choose the furthest zone(s) they wish to travel to when purchasing the pass. The $6 day pass and $10 day pass are only available within the Ventra app.
 A monthly pass provides unlimited travel between any two zones for one passenger on every day of a respective month. Monthly passes can be used on any line within the specified zones. Monthly passes can be purchased from ticket agents, or from the Ventra app. Monthly pass holders may also travel beyond the zones listed on the monthly pass by purchasing incremental tickets from conductors on the train. Incremental tickets cost $1 beyond the first zone and 50 cents for every additional zone thereafter. There is no surcharge to purchase incremental tickets for monthly pass holders. For a pilot period starting in July 2022, running through the end of the year, Metra is selling a "Super Saver" monthly pass, which provides unlimited travel between all zones on any line for $100, or $70 as a reduced fare for the Metra Electric District and Rock Island District. Also starting in July 2022, PlusBus and Link-Up have been combined to form the new Regional Connect Pass. The Regional Connect Pass is available for $30 to monthly pass holders and allows for unlimited travel on CTA buses and the 'L', as well as Pace buses. Passengers who purchase a monthly pass via the Ventra app are able to purchase and load the pass directly onto a linked Ventra card. Passengers who purchase a monthly pass from a Metra ticket agent can purchase the pass in the form of a Ventra ticket.

Reduced fare programs 
Metra allows some travelers to purchase reduced fare tickets or even ride for free. These reduced fare and free ride programs are administered by Metra and the RTA. Some pre-college students, youth, senior citizens, members of the United States Armed Forces and persons with disabilities may qualify for these programs. Time-based and geographical restrictions apply to these programs and passengers must ensure they qualify before attempting to purchase special tickets or ride for free. Cook County launched The Fair Transit pilot on January 4, 2021, scheduled to initially last for three years. Under the pilot, all riders on the Metra Electric and Rock Island lines will pay Metra's reduced fare rates.

On the Union Pacific North Line, passengers headed to an event at  may ride to the event for free after showing their Ravinia Festival e-ticket to the conductor.

Safety and security 

Metra employees, the Metra Police Department and other public safety agencies are responsible for maintaining safety and security on its lines, aboard its trains and at stations all to various degrees. Although rail transport is one of the safest forms of land travel, compromises to Metra's safety and security can occur through pedestrian accidents, suicide attempts, vehicle collisions, derailment, terrorism and other incidents. Failing to maintain safety and security can result in equipment and infrastructure damage, extensive service disruptions, traumatic injuries and loss of life. Therefore, Metra and other agencies consider safety a top priority and dedicate a significant amount of resources to combat these dangers.

Starting in the early summer of 2013, Metra has announced plans to up police patrols on to the seven lines the agency operates: the Milwaukee Districts North and West, the North Central Service, the Heritage Corridor, South West Service, Rock Island, and Electric District. The police patrols will not be on the BNSF and Union Pacific train lines because those lines are operated by the railroads that own them and security falls to those companies. When asked why there were increasing patrols spokesman Michael Gillis said, "There is no particular reason, other than the fact that we want to be more proactive and more deliberately visible to our riders".

Law enforcement 
The Metra Police Department is a special law enforcement agency charged with providing police services to passengers, employees, equipment and property. The department has more than 100 police officers and is responsible for the safety of all routes and stations. In an effort to help coordinate emergency preparedness and incident management, all Metra police officers are certified in the National Incident Management System. In addition, Metra police works with the Chicago Police Department as a member of the Chicago Alternative Policing Strategy. Thomas A. Cook was the only Metra police officer that has been killed in the line of duty thus far.

Rail safety 
The focus on rail safety by Metra comes from many fronts beyond operations including emergency preparedness and public awareness. The setup of railway platforms, use of grade crossing signals and horn blasts make up a critical system used to communicate movements of commuter trains to pedestrians and vehicles. Outside of these operational components, Metra aggressively pursues safety through public awareness. Metra utilizes its own Operation Lifesaver program and uses it to help spread safety messages. Metra also holds events promoting rail safety at schools and organizes a safety poster contest awarding winners with prizes and features their posters on monthly passes and at stations.

Metra has been honored with several E. H. Harriman Awards for employee safety, most recently with a Bronze award in class B (line-haul railroads with between 4 and 15 million employee hours per year) for 2005. Previous Harriman Awards conferred to Metra include Gold awards for 2003 and 2004 and a Silver award for 2002.

Metra expects to implement positive train control on its entire system in 2019, four years after the federally mandated 2015 deadline.

Incidents 

There were 156 non-employee fatalities involving Metra equipment and Metra owned track between 2001 and 2010. On average 15 people were killed annually based on data from that decade. The highest number of fatalities in a year throughout that time occurred in 2002, with 23 deaths and in 2010, with 21 deaths. The majority of these fatalities occurred at grade crossings and on railway involving an impact with a train; only four deaths involved passengers aboard the train.

The worst commuter rail disaster in Illinois occurred before the formation of Regional Transportation Authority. The 1972 Chicago commuter rail crash consisted of a two train collision on the Metra Electric, then under the control of the Illinois Central. The collision resulted in 45 deaths and 332 injuries. Two decades later, Metra experienced its first rail disaster, the 1995 Fox River Grove bus–train collision. This accident involved a collision of a Union Pacific Northwest Line train and a school bus at a grade crossing resulting in 21 injuries and the deaths of seven high school students. In 2003, another incident involved a Rock Island District train derailing while switching from one track to another, injuring 45 passengers. In 2005, a train carrying 200 passengers along the same stretch of track derailed and then collided with a steel bridge resulting in two deaths and 117 injured. The cause of both accidents was ruled to be human error; the trains were going at speeds in excess of  when they should have been going .

The passenger who was killed, a 72-year-old woman from Downers Grove, was ejected from a window of the train during the collision. This incident, as of May 2022, is the second incident in Metra's history that resulted in a passenger fatality.

In addition to the loss of life, injuries, damage and service disruptions caused by accidents, Metra and other transportation agencies have been involved in multimillion-dollar lawsuits and settlements stemming from safety failures. These failures have also resulted in updated safety policies and adjustments of equipment and warning devices.

Rolling stock

Current locomotives 
All of Metra's locomotives are diesel-electric locomotives. The bulk of its locomotive fleet consists of F40PH locomotives. The Electric District uses electric multiple units.

Retired locomotives

Coaches

Private club coaches

Electric multiple units 

Metra's electric units are also known as Highliners.

See also 
 Mass transit in Chicago
 Chicago 'L'
 Chicago Transit Authority
 Pace (transit)
 South Shore Line (NICTD)

References

Further reading 

J. David Ingles, Metra: "Best Commuter Train", Trains July 1993

External links 

Metra
Regional Transportation Authority

 
Regional Transportation Authority (Illinois)
Commuter rail in the United States
Transportation in Chicago
Railroads in the Chicago metropolitan area
Railway lines in Chicago
Standard gauge railways in the United States
Transit agencies in Illinois
1984 establishments in Illinois